The 2005 Miami Hurricanes football team represented the University of Miami during the 2005 NCAA Division I-A football season. It was the Hurricanes' 80th season of football and 2nd as a member of the Atlantic Coast Conference. The Hurricanes were led by fifth-year head coach Larry Coker and played their home games at the Orange Bowl. They finished the season 9–3 overall and 6–2 in the ACC to finish in second place in the Coastal Division. They were invited to the Peach Bowl where they lost to LSU, 40–3.

Season
Miami dropped its first game of the season at archrival Florida State, 10–7, when punter/holder Brian Monroe fumbled the snap on a 28-yard game-tying field goal attempt by kicker Jon Peattie with 2:16 left to play in the fourth quarter. Despite gaining 313 yards of offense to Florida State's 170, Miami lost to its archrival for the first time since 1999 (6 straight wins by Miami). The three turnovers, two missed field goals, and a muffed hold on the game-tying field goal attempt were also a contributing factor in the outcome for Miami.

The Hurricanes rebounded by winning 8 straight games (including a 27–7 win over previously unbeaten Virginia Tech in Blacksburg) and climbed to the #3 spot in both polls. However, any hopes of a sixth national championship were dashed when the Hurricanes were upset, 14–10, by Georgia Tech at home on November 19 (the game was originally scheduled for October 22, but was postponed in the wake of Hurricane Wilma). The Miami offense, which had problems all season, sputtered badly against Georgia Tech and quarterback Kyle Wright was booed continuously during the second half of the game by the Orange Bowl crowd for his ineffective play. The loss also knocked Miami out of a spot in the inaugural ACC Championship Game.

Miami finished the regular season at 9–2 (6–2 ACC), ranked #9 in both polls, and received an invitation to return to the Peach Bowl to face the 10th-ranked LSU Tigers. However, this trip to Atlanta was much different from the Hurricanes' last visit, as Wright and the Miami offense struggled, and the defense, which had been the top-ranked defense in Division I-A for most of the season, was shredded by the LSU offense. Miami was routed, 40–3, in the worst-bowl loss in the program's history. The 'Canes finished the 2005 campaign with a 9–3 record and ranked #18/17 (USA Today/AP).

Aftermath
Coker's three-loss seasons at Miami were viewed as failures, and the season-opening loss to FSU and the bowl loss to LSU made the 2005 campaign particularly difficult for alumni and fans of the proud program to swallow. The Hurricane offense had been the center of criticism all season long (as well as during the two previous seasons). In particular, offensive coordinator Dan Werner, offensive line coach Art Kehoe, and quarterback Kyle Wright were assigned most of the blame. In the aftermath of the Peach Bowl loss, head coach Larry Coker fired four assistants: Werner, Kehoe, running backs coach Don Soldinger, and linebacker coach Vernon Hargreaves. Kehoe's firing was particularly controversial, as he had been with the program as a player and then a coach for over 25 years and took part in all five of Miami's national championships.

With Miami failing to win a conference championship or go to a BCS bowl the previous two years and not having won a national championship since 2001, it was widely assumed that Coker would enter the 2006 season on the hot seat and need to take Miami to a BCS bowl to keep his job.

Schedule

Awards and honors

First Team All-Americans
Kelly Jennings, CB (Sports Illustrated)
Brandon Meriweather, FS (Football Writers Association of America, ABC Sports)
Eric Winston, LT (Walter Camp Foundation, American Football Coaches Association, Sports Illustrated)

All-ACC Selections (First Team)
Devin Hester, KR/PR
Kelly Jennings, CB
Tyrone Moss, RB
Eric Winston, LT

Awards Finalists
Bold indicates winners
Eric Winston, LT – Jacobs Trophy (Top ACC Lineman)

Jack Harding University of Miami MVP Award
Eric Winston, LT

References

Miami
Miami Hurricanes football seasons
Miami Hurricanes football